Donna K. Harman is an American information retrieval researcher. She is a group leader in the Retrieval Group at the National Institute of Standards and Technology. Harman won the Tony Kent Strix award in 1999.

References

External links 

 

National Institute of Standards and Technology people
20th-century American scientists
21st-century American scientists
20th-century American women scientists
21st-century American women scientists
American computer scientists
American women computer scientists
Living people
Year of birth missing (living people)